Gautier d'Arras (died c. 1185, Arras) was a Flemish or French trouvère.

He is called Galterus attrebatensis or Walterus de Altrebat in many contemporary Latin documents, the first of which dates from 1160, where he is mentioned as a property owner in Arras (Atrebatum in Latin). Gautier appears to have been a knight of Arras who between 1160 and 1170 held many important fiefs of St. Vaast's Abbey and between 1166 and 1185 was an official at the court of Philip of Flanders. An apparent will is known dating from 1185, in which his wife Agnes and oldest son Roger are named.

He dedicated his romance of Eracle to Theobald V, Count of Blois (d. 1191); among his other patrons were Marie, countess of Champagne, daughter of Louis VII and Eleanor of Guienne and Baldwin IV, Count of Hainaut.

Eracle, the hero of which becomes emperor of Constantinople as Heraclius, is purely a roman d'aventures and enjoyed great popularity. His second romance, Ille et Galeron, dedicated to Beatrix, the second wife of Frederick Barbarossa, treats of a similar situation to that outlined in the lay of Eliduc by Marie de France.

See the Œuvres de Gautier d'Arras, ed. E Løseth (2 vols, Paris, 1890); Hist. litt. de la France, vol. xxii (1852); A Dinaux, Les Trouvères (1833-1843), vol. iii.

References

 F. A. G. Cowper, More Data on Gautier d'Arras, PMLA, Vol. 64, No. 1 (Mar., 1949), pp. 302–316

12th-century births
1180s deaths
French poets
French male poets